Jean the Tenant is a 1917 Hungarian film directed by Michael Curtiz.

External links

1917 films
Films directed by Michael Curtiz
Hungarian black-and-white films
Hungarian silent films
Austro-Hungarian films